Hyaleucerea trifasciata is a moth of the subfamily Arctiinae. It was described by Arthur Gardiner Butler in 1877. It is found in the Amazon region.

References

Euchromiina
Moths described in 1877